Jago Bangla is an Indian Bengali daily newspaper published from Kolkata, West Bengal, India. This is an organ of All India Trinamool Congress. This paper is used by the party to convey its message to different parts of Bengal, specially rural Bengal.  the newspaper had a circulation of 70,000 in West Bengal. It became daily from weekly edition from 21 July 2021.[3]

See also 
 Ganadabi
 Ganashakti

References

External links 
  

Bengali-language newspapers published in India
Newspapers published in Kolkata
2011 establishments in West Bengal
Publications established in 2011